Cesare Gennari (12 December 1637 – 11 February 1688) was an Italian painter of the Baroque period. His Saint Mary Magdalene is in the Pinacoteca Civica di Cento. His Apparition of the Virgin to Saint Nicholas of Bari is at the Pinacoteca di Bologna.

In his later work Cesare "shed all traces of Guercinesque idiom, adopting instead the courtly accents of St James's and Saint-Germain".

Biography
Son of Ercole Gennari and born at Cento, he was trained in the studio of his maternal uncle, Giovanni Francesco Barbieri called "Guercino", in Bologna. Cesare's uncle, Benedetto Gennari, and his brother, Benedetto II Gennari (1633–1715), were also painters in the circle of Guercino. Cesare and the younger Benedetto were heirs of Guercino's studio, papers and effects, preserved for some time at Casa Gennari, Bologna.

He married Francesca Ripa, and had two sons,  Gianfrancesco and Filippo. Among his pupils was Ercole Gaetano Bertuzzi.

Sources

References

External links
 

Painters from Bologna
Italian Baroque painters
1641 births
1688 deaths
Italian male painters
People from Cento
17th-century Italian painters